The 1925 Washington Huskies football team was an American football team that represented the University of Washington as a member of the Pacific Coast Conference (PCC) during the 1925 PCC football season. In its fifth season under head coach Enoch Bagshaw, the team compiled a 10–1–1 record, won the PCC championship, lost to Alabama in the 1926 Rose Bowl, and outscored all opponents by a total of 480 to 59. The team was ranked No. 7 in the nation in the Dickinson System ratings released in January 1926.

Fullback Elmer Tesreau was the team captain. Halfback Wildcat Wilson was selected as a consensus first-team player on the 1925 All-America team. Other key players on the team included quarterback George Guttormsen, tackle Walden Erickson, guard Egbert Brix, center Douglas Bonamy, and ends Judson Cutting and Clifford Marker.

Schedule

References

Washington
Washington Huskies football seasons
Pac-12 Conference football champion seasons
Washington Huskies football